Līgo Parish is an administrative unit of Gulbene Municipality (prior to the 2009 administrative reforms Gulbene District), Latvia.

Parishes of Latvia
Gulbene Municipality